Methylococcus capsulatus is an obligately methanotrophic gram-negative, non-motile coccoid bacterium. M. capsulatus are thermotolerant; their cells are encapsulated and tend to have a diplococcoid shape. In addition to methane, M. capsulatus is able to oxidize some organic hydrogen containing compounds such as methanol.
It has been used commercially to produce animal feed from natural gas.

Metabolism and genetics
Methylococcus capsulatus is a Type I methanotroph, meaning that it is a member of the Gammaproteobacteria and that it utilizes the ribulose monophosphate pathway (RuMP) for formaldehyde assimilation. Methane is first oxidized to methanol, which then gets converted into formaldehyde. Formaldehyde can then be (1) further oxidized to formate and carbon dioxide for energy production or (2) assimilated into biomass.

Various strains of M. capsulatus have been isolated and studied, particularly M. capsulatus (Bath), M. capsulatus (Texas) and M. capsulatus (Aberdeen).

The genome sequence of M. capsulatus (Bath) is available.

Growth requirements
M. capsulatus has also been demonstrated to be thermotolerant – that is, it can grow well up to 50 °C, though its optimum growth temperature is 37 °C. In addition, M. capsulatus can live in conditions in which there is little molecular oxygen available.

Commercial use
In 1999, Norferm a subsidiary of the Norwegian oil company Statoil, opened a 10,000 tons per year plant to produce animal feed from natural gas from M. capsulatus in Tjeldbergodden, Norway. The plant was shut down in 2006 because of low animal feed prices, the product had not yet been approved by the EU and high natural gas prices.

In 2016 Calysta, an American biotech company, opened a plant in Teesside, UK, to produce up to 100 tons of fish feed a year from natural gas using M. capsulatus. The company also announced plans to build a similar plant in Memphis, Tennessee with an eventual capacity of 200,000 ton a year with the agricultural business company Cargill. Another company, Unibio, also opened a plant to produce animal feed from natural gas in 2016 with a capacity of 80 tons per year using M. capsulatus in Kalundborg, Denmark. In 2018 a licensee of Unibio constructed an industrial scale plant in Ivangorod, Russia close to the border of Estonia. The plant has a capacity of 6,000 tonnes of protein per year.

References 

Gammaproteobacteria